Tony Cedras is a South African accordion, harmonium, keyboard and guitar player. He was born in Elsie's River, Cape Province, South Africa in 1952. He has performed or recorded, most often on accordion, with various well-known artists, including Paul Simon, Harry Belafonte, Miriam Makeba, Henry Threadgill, Muhal Richard Abrams, Cassandra Wilson, Hugh Masekela, Tony Bird and Gigi.
Tony got his first professional break under the tutorship of Pacific Express bass player, Paul Abrahams. He was drafted into the band as a trumpet player and keyboard player. He was in every lineup of Paul Simon's band from 1987 to 2012, despite not, as yet, featuring on a studio recording with Mr Simon

Discography

With Pharoah Sanders
Save Our Children (Verve, 1998)

With Henry Threadgill
Song Out of My Trees
Carry the Day (Columbia, 1995)
Where's Your Cup?

With Cassandra Wilson
Blue Light 'til Dawn
New Moon Daughter

External links
Official website

South African accordionists
South African accordionists
Living people
Musicians from Cape Town
21st-century accordionists
Year of birth missing (living people)